Saint Jacques Street (officially in ), or St. James Street, is a major street in Montreal, Quebec, Canada, running from Old Montreal westward to Lachine.

The street is commonly known by two names, "St. James Street" in English (after St. James's, London) and rue Saint-Jacques in French. Both names are used in English and French, although Saint-Jacques is the most common for geographical reference. St. James Street is usually used in reference to the street's historic importance as a financial district.

History

A main thoroughfare passing through Old Montreal, the street was first opened in 1672. The portion between McGill Street and place Saint Henri was originally called Bonaventure Street (rue Saint-Bonaventure). This name has passed down to Place Bonaventure, Bonaventure Expressway, and Bonaventure Metro station, despite the disappearance of their original referents.

In the second half of the 19th century and the first half of the 20th century, St. James Street was the centre of Montreal's financial district and where several major English insurance, banking, and trust companies built their Canadian head offices. Prior to World War I, Canadian, provincial, and major municipal governments along with important industries such as the railways, public utility and canal companies obtained most of their capital financing in the United Kingdom or the United States. At the end of the War, St. James Street grew rapidly and although by the 1920s there were stock exchanges in  Toronto, Winnipeg, Calgary and Vancouver, St. James Street's stock brokerage houses and the Montreal Stock Exchange were the most important in all of Canada. At the time of its construction in 1928, the Royal Bank of Canada's new headquarters at 360 St. James Street  was the tallest building in the British Empire. The St James St. area was also the head office of the Bank of Montreal, and the informal head office of the Bank of Nova Scotia.  It was also home to the major brokerage houses such as Nesbitt, Thomson and Company, Pitfield, MacKay, Ross, Royal Securities Corporation and others.

Some companies, past and present, located on St. James Street are:

 50 : Ottawa Hotel, Montreal
 60 :  Versailles Building 
 100 : New York Life Insurance Company
 105-107 : Royal Trust
 119 : Bank of Montreal - main Montreal branch
 201-215 : Canadian Pacific Express
 210-212 : Yorkshire Insurance Company
 215 : McMaster Meighen, lawyers
 225 : National Trust Company
 231-235 : Montreal Star
 240 : Guardian Trust Company - The Dominion Bank
 244 : Royal Securities Corporation
 249-251 : Jones-Heward Financial Services
 262-266 : Montreal City and District Savings Bank
 265 : Canadian Bank of Commerce
 275 : Canada Life
 278-288 : Molson Bank
 355 : Merchants Bank of Canada
 360 : Royal Bank of Canada
 388-390 : Sovereign Bank of Canada then Union Bank and Commercial Union Assurance Co.
 393 : Crown Trust Company
 437 : Eastern Townships Bank then the Commercial Union Assurance Co. and the Bank of Nova Scotia

East of Place d'Armes square, the street was home to two French-Canadian financial institutions, the Banque Canadienne Nationale and the Banque du Peuple, long gone now.

Decline
A number chose to gradually move their official head offices to Toronto, Ontario, while others shifted all future expansion to Toronto or other major Canadian centres. As a result, the St. James Street financial district has all but disappeared.

Recent history

During the 1990s, the Montreal Expos baseball club unveiled plans to build a new stadium in downtown Montreal, right off St. Jacques Street, just south of the Bell Centre. When provincial funding for the new building fell through, the Expos did not continue with their plan and sold the property to developers. That stretch of Saint Jacques is now undergoing considerable gentrification.

Today, the stretch of St. Jacques Street between McGill Street and Saint Laurent Boulevard is still notable mostly for its grand Neo-Classical buildings on the part of the street running through the Old Montreal district. These include Bank of Montreal's domed Montreal Main Branch, the former headquarters of Royal Bank of Canada, the Canadian Bank of Commerce, the Molson Bank and the Canada Life Insurance Company. More modern buildings include the Montreal World Trade Centre and the Stock Exchange Tower.

Farther west, St. Jacques Street runs through the residential neighbourhoods of Little Burgundy, Saint-Henri, Notre-Dame-de-Grâce and Lachine, as well as the suburb of Montreal West, where it is instead known as Avon Road. Square-Victoria–OACI,  Lionel-Groulx and Place-Saint-Henri Metro stations are located on St. Jacques, to the west, it gives access to Autoroute 20 in Notre-Dame-de-Grâce, where it passes through a largely industrial and large-surface commercial district at the top of the Falaise Saint-Jacques. The McGill University Health Centre superhospital fronts Saint-Jacques in Notre-Dame-de-Grâce.

Image gallery

References

External links

 City of Montreal website for St. James St.

Economic history of Canada
Financial districts in Canada
Old Montreal
Streets in Montreal